St Germain's Railway Station (Manx: Stashoon Raad Yiarn Cheeill Charmane) was a station on the Manx Northern Railway in the Isle of Man, later owned and operated by the Isle of Man Railway; it served the small village of the same name and was an intermediate stopping place on a line that ran between St John's and Ramsey.

Description
Before Peel Road station opened, St Germain's was the preferred disembarkation point for Peel-bound passengers from the train from Ramsey. This was because it was far quicker to walk to Peel from here (about 1.5 miles), than to travel to St John's and change trains for Peel.

Buildings
The distinctive station building is on the northern side of the small village; these days it serves as a private dwelling but its design clearly shows its origins as a station. Consisting of two tall gables and associated buildings, all constructed on local sandstone, it is of the same design as the stations at Ballaugh and Kirk Michael, both of which also still survive today.

Closure and afterwards
This station was not latterly staffed, and although the passing loop was seldom used in later years it remained in place until closure in 1968. The station sits to the side of a main road and is still viewable today; the line has been converted into a footpath enabling access to the site.

Route

See also
Isle of Man Railway stations
Manx Northern Railway

References

Sources
 [Isle of Man Steam Railway Supporters' Association]

Railway stations in the Isle of Man
Railway stations opened in 1879
Railway stations closed in 1961